Bagh Kuchek (also Romanized as Bāgh Kūchek; also known as Bāgh Kocheh, Bāgh Kocheḩeh, and Bāgh Kūcheh) is a village in Rezvan Rural District, Jebalbarez District, Jiroft County, Kerman Province, Iran. At the 2006 census, its population was 19, in 4 families.

References 

Populated places in Jiroft County